Caroline Susan E. Homer  is an Australian midwifery researcher and international advocate for women's health rights. She is Co-Program Director, Maternal and Child Health at the Burnet Institute in Melbourne and Visiting Distinguished Professor of Midwifery at the University of Technology Sydney.

Academic career 
Homer graduated from University of Technology Sydney with a masters in nursing (1997) and PhD titled Continuity of maternity care in a community setting : a randomised controlled trial using the Zelan design (2001). She completed a masters of medical science at the University of Sydney in 2008.

Homer was appointed Co-Program Director, Maternal and Child Health at the Burnet Institute in 2018. She was a member of the World Health Organization (WHO) Maternal and Perinatal Health Executive Guideline Development Group from 2017 to 2020 and was then appointed Inaugural Chair of WHO's Strategic and Technical Advisory Group of Experts for Maternal, Newborn, Child, Adolescent Health, and Nutrition from 2020 to 2022.

As of 2021 she is on the board of the Perinatal Society of Australia and New Zealand and is a former president of the Australian College of Midwives (ACM) and has been editor of their journal, Women and Birth, since July 2018.

In 2020, the WHO's international year of the nurse and the midwife, she reviewed and wrote on care by midwives in low-, middle- and high-income countries and also answered the question, "What Would Florence think of midwives and nurses in 2020?"

Honours and recognition 
In 2013 Homer was made a life member of ACM (NSW) and they set up the Caroline Homer Writing Prize in the same year in her honour.

Homer was made an Officer of the Order of Australia in the 2017 Queen's Birthday Honours for "distinguished service to medicine in the field of midwifery as a clinician, researcher, author and educator, through the development of worldwide education standards, and to professional organisations". She was elected a Fellow of the Australian Academy of Health and Medical Sciences in 2019.

Selected works

Books

Articles

References

External links 

 Dr Caroline Homer — Profile at the World Health Organization
Leaders in Focus: Prof Caroline Homer AO in O&G Magazine, the journal of the Royal Australian and New Zealand College of Obstetricians and Gynaecologists

 
 
 

Living people
Year of birth missing (living people)
Officers of the Order of Australia
Fellows of the Australian Academy of Health and Medical Sciences
Academic staff of the University of Technology Sydney
Australian midwives